Ali Jangal (also Romanized as ‘Ālī Jangal; also known as ‘Ālī Changal) is a village in Bala Khiyaban-e Litkuh Rural District, in the Central District of Amol County, Mazandaran Province, Iran. At the 2006 census, its population was 85, in 22 families.

References 

Populated places in Amol County